Plant Disease is a peer-reviewed scientific journal of plant pathology focusing on new diseases, epidemics, and methods of disease control. It is a continuation of The Plant Disease Bulletin (1917–1922) and The Plant Disease Reporter (1923–1979), both publications of the US Department of Agriculture. It is currently published by the American Phytopathological Society and edited by Mary Burrows (Montana State University).

Indexing and abstracting
According to the Journal Citation Reports, the journal has a 2020 impact factor of 4.438. The journal is indexed in the following bibliographic databases:
Academic Search Premier
AGRICOLA
Biosis
Food Science & Technology Abstracts
PASCAL
Science Citation Index
Scopus

References

External links
 
 American Phytopathological Society (APS) Home Page
 
 
 

Botany journals
Publications established in 1922
Delayed open access journals